Henri Jokiharju (born 17 June 1999) is a Finnish professional ice hockey defenceman for  the Buffalo Sabres of the National Hockey League (NHL). Jokiharju was selected 29th overall by the Chicago Blackhawks in the first round of the 2017 NHL Entry Draft.

Playing career

Jokiharju was brought up first in the Jokerit youth program, playing for their under-16 and under-18 teams in 2013–14 and 2014–15, respectively, before joining the under-18 and under-20 teams of Tappara in 2015–16. In his draft eligible year, 2016–17, Jokiharju went to play for the Portland Winterhawks of the Western Hockey League (WHL). He posted nine goals and 39 assists in 71 games for a total of 48 points. In the playoffs, the Winterhawks defeated the Prince George Cougars in six games before dropping out in five to the Kelowna Rockets, with Jokiharju adding three assists in 11 games during the playoff run. Jokiharju was named to the Western Conference Second-Team All-Star during the 2017–18 season.

On 12 June 2018, Jokiharju signed a three-year contract with the Chicago Blackhawks. After participating at the Blackhawks training camp, Jokiharju made his NHL debut on 4 October in the Blackhawks' season opener against the Ottawa Senators. In his second game, Jokiharju recorded his first NHL point with an assist on captain Jonathan Toews' goal in a 5–4 overtime win over the St. Louis Blues.

On 9 July 2019, Jokiharju was traded by the Blackhawks to the Buffalo Sabres in exchange for fellow first-rounder, Alexander Nylander. On 1 November 2019, Jokiharju scored his first career goal against the Washington Capitals. On 2 September 2021, Jokiharju was re-signed a three-year, $7.5 million contract with the Sabres.

Personal life
Both his father and brother also play ice hockey. His father Juha played professionally, mainly in the Finnish SM-liiga, while his older brother Juho played college ice hockey at Clarkson University from 2015 to 2019.

Career statistics

Regular season and playoffs

International

Awards and honours

References

External links
 

1999 births
Living people
Buffalo Sabres players
Chicago Blackhawks draft picks
Chicago Blackhawks players
Finnish ice hockey defencemen
National Hockey League first-round draft picks
Portland Winterhawks players
Rockford IceHogs (AHL) players
Sportspeople from Oulu